Sayan Erlanuly Daniyar (born 5 October 1999) is a Kazakhstani ice hockey player for Saryarka Karaganda and the Kazakhstani national team.

He represented Kazakhstan at the 2021 IIHF World Championship. He represented Kazakhstan at the 2023 Winter World University Games, winning a bronze medal.

References

External links

1999 births
Living people
Barys Nur-Sultan players
HC Astana players
Kazakhstani ice hockey centres
Sportspeople from Astana
Universiade medalists in ice hockey
Medalists at the 2023 Winter World University Games
Universiade bronze medalists for Kazakhstan